Dead in the Water is a boat racing game, released for the PlayStation on March 19, 1999.

Gameplay
Dead in the Water is a boat racing game. The game features nine tracks, with thirteen different characters to play.

Development
The game was originally planned for release in December 1998. Dead in the Water was re-released for PSone Classics for the PlayStation 3 and PlayStation Vita.

Reception

Previews for the game compared it to other racing games, such as Jet Moto and Twisted Metal.

Dead in the Water received "mixed" reviews according to the review aggregation website GameRankings. Next Generation said, "A decent-looking 3D polygonal game, Dead in the Water overall is a mixed bag, with the straight battle races being the ultimate lure. But in any case, steer clear of this shipwreck."

Notes

References

External links
 
 

1999 video games
Motorboat racing video games
Multiplayer and single-player video games
PlayStation (console) games
ASC Games games
PlayStation (console)-only games